Eliassou Issiaka (born 12 August 1985) is a Malian football player currently playing for the Egyptian Premier League side Smouha Sporting Club as a right back. He is a member of Mali national football team.

References

1985 births
Living people
Malian footballers
Association football fullbacks
Mali international footballers
Al Masry SC players
Stade Malien players
Al-Orobah FC players
Saudi Professional League players
21st-century Malian people